Zoran Erceg (Serbian Cyrillic: Зоран Ерцег; born 11 January 1985) is a Serbian former professional basketball player. He represented the Serbian national basketball team internationally.

Professional career

Early years
Erceg started playing professionally with Polet Keramika Novi Bečej in 2002, before going to FMP in 2003. In 2006 he was shortly loaned to Borac Čačak.

Olympiacos (2008–11)
He signed a 5-year contract with the Greek team Olympiacos Piraeus in June 2008. In December 2009, Erceg was loaned to Panionios for the rest of the 2009–10 season.

Beşiktaş (2011–12)
In August 2011, he signed a one-year deal with the Turkish team Beşiktaş. With them, he won every competition they participated in, the Turkish League championship, Turkish Cup and a third-tier European competition EuroChallenge. His games in Beşiktaş attracted the interest of many European big clubs.

CSKA Moscow (2012–13)
On 29 June 2012 he signed a three-year contract with the Russian team CSKA Moscow. During his stint in CSKA, Erceg has mostly came off-the-bench, producing 6.2 points and 2.5 rebounds per game. He won the Russian League championship and the VTB United League.

Galatasaray (2013–15)
Despite having a three-year contract, Erceg terminated it and signed a two-year contract with Galatasaray Liv Hospital in July 2013. In the new team, Erceg had bigger role than in his previous team. In April Euroleague game overtime loss against his former team CSKA Moscow, he set career-high and also team record 35 points, while also adding 9 rebounds and 2 steals. He finished season with career-highs of 11.2 points and 4.9 rebounds over 25 games. In the 2014–15 season his role in the team increased even more. He had a season-high 32 points in a double overtime 110–103 victory over Crvena zvezda. He also hit a 30 feet far buzzer-beater to put the game in an overtime. For such performance, he was named the Euroleague MVP of Round 6, for the first time in his career.

National team career
Erceg played with the senior Serbian national basketball team at the EuroBasket 2007.

He represented Serbia once again at the EuroBasket 2015 under head coach Aleksandar Đorđević. In the first phase of the tournament, Serbia dominated in the toughest Group B with 5-0 record, and then eliminated Finland and Czech Republic in the round-of-16 and quarterfinals, respectively. Erceg had his best performance scoring 20 points against Czech Republic in the quarterfinal game. However, Serbia was stopped in the semifinal game by Lithuania 64–67, and eventually lost to the host team France in the bronze-medal game 68–81. Over 9 tournament games, Erceg averaged 8.3 points, 2.6 rebounds, and 1.2 assists per game on 52.4% shooting from the field.

Career statistics

EuroLeague

|-
| style="text-align:left;"| 2008–09
| style="text-align:left;" rowspan=2| Olympiacos
| 20 || 1 || 11.8 || .583 || .445 || .559 || 2.1 || .3 || .5 || .1 || 5.0 || 4.5
|-
| style="text-align:left;"| 2010–11
| 16 || 4 || 17.8 || .413 || .297 || .875 || 3.1 || .5 || .4 || .4 || 5.9 || 5.7
|-
| style="text-align:left;"| 2012–13
| style="text-align:left;"| CSKA
| 15 || 5 || 14.4 || .457 || .375 || .917 || 2.5 || .5 || .7 || .1 || 6.2 || 6.5
|-
| style="text-align:left;"| 2013–14
| style="text-align:left;" rowspan=2| Galatasaray
| 25 || 23 || 27.5 || .400 || .333 || .925 || 4.9 || 1.6 || .6 || .2 || 11.2 || 13.2
|-
| style="text-align:left;"| 2014–15
| 22 || 22 || 30.7 || .408 || .388 || .899 || 4.3 || .9 || 1.2 || .1 || 15.0 || 15.4
|- class="sortbottom"
| style="text-align:left;"| Career
| style="text-align:left;"|
| 98 || 55 || 22.5 || .427 || .363 || .854 || 3.6 || .8 || .7 || .2 || 9.1 || 9.7

See also 
 List of Serbia men's national basketball team players

References

External links

 Zoran Erceg at abaliga.com
 Zoran Erceg at eurobasket.com
 Zoran Erceg at euroleague.net
 Zoran Erceg at fiba.com
 Zoran Erceg at tblstat.net

1985 births
Living people
ABA League players
Basketball League of Serbia players
Beşiktaş men's basketball players
Centers (basketball)
Galatasaray S.K. (men's basketball) players
KK Borac Čačak players
KK FMP (1991–2011) players
Olympiacos B.C. players
Panionios B.C. players
PBC CSKA Moscow players
People from Pakrac
Power forwards (basketball)
Serbia men's national basketball team players
Serbian men's basketball players
Serbian expatriate basketball people in Greece
Serbian expatriate basketball people in Russia
Serbian expatriate basketball people in Turkey
Serbs of Croatia
Croatian expatriate basketball people in Serbia